Donja Batina  is a village in Zlatar, Krapina-Zagorje County, Croatia. 

Populated places in Krapina-Zagorje County